Bishan Daur is a village of Jhelum District in the Punjab province of Pakistan. It is located at 33°12'0″N 73°25'0E with an altitude of 430 metres (1414 feet). The name was officially changed to Dewan e hazoori during the first term of prime minister Nawaz Sharif upon the request and invitation of Custodian of the shrine of Hazrat Syed Abdullah Shah DewaneHazoori , Pir Syed Dildar Ali Shah who is also the chairman of Majlis e Qadria Hazrat Dewan e Hazoori 

Main tribe in the village is Awan Budhal, who use the title of Raja .

References

Populated places in Jhelum District